Light House Melbourne (also simply referred to as Lighthouse) is a residential skyscraper in Melbourne, Australia. Located on 450 Elizabeth Street, Melbourne, the project was designed by Elenberg Fraser and developed by Hengyi Australia. The skyscraper rises to a height of 218 metres (715 feet) and comprises 69 levels and 607 apartment dwellings. The ground floor is occupied by a reception and mail room, the eighth floor is occupied by a gym, swimming-pool, and sauna, and the remaining floors are residential. Upon its completion in 2017, it became one of the tallest residential buildings in Melbourne.

Construction 
Proposed in 2012, the skyscraper received planning approval by then-Planning Minister Matthew Guy later that year; and in 2014, Guy approved an amendment to the plans which would see extra height and floors added to the development. Construction on the project commenced in May 2015, before topping-out in February 2017. The project was completed later in 2017.

See also 
 Lighthouse
 List of tallest buildings in Australia
 Nearby features
 Queen Victoria Market
 Victoria One
 Vision Apartments

Notes

References

External links 
 

Skyscrapers in Melbourne
Residential skyscrapers in Australia
Apartment buildings in Melbourne
Elizabeth Street, Melbourne
Buildings and structures in Melbourne City Centre
2017 establishments in Australia
Buildings and structures completed in 2017